Deserticossus praeclarus is a moth in the family Cossidae. It is found in Turkmenistan. The habitat consists of deserts.

The length of the forewings is 16–25 mm. The forewings are light-grey with a row of dark strokes along the costal margin. The hindwings are light. Adults have been recorded on wing in May.

References

Natural History Museum Lepidoptera generic names catalog

Cossinae
Moths described in 1898
Moths of Asia